Natalie Saville (born 7 September 1978) is an Australian race walker.

She finished second in the 20 km race at the 2006 Commonwealth Games behind her sister, Jane, after finishing 4th at the 2002 Commonwealth Games and 36th in the same event at the 2004 Summer Olympics in Athens. At a national level, she has won three junior championships at 5000m, one national 10 km championship and finished in the top three on eight occasions.    Saville is coached by her brother-in-law, Matt White.

Both Jane and Natalie Saville live in the City of Randwick Local Government Area. Natalie Saville was presented with the Keys to the City of Randwick on 22 October 2002 by Mayor Dominic Sullivan in recognition of outstanding achievement in sport. Her sister Jane was also presented with the Key to the City of Randwick at the same time.

References

1978 births
Living people
Australian female racewalkers
Olympic athletes of Australia
Athletes (track and field) at the 2004 Summer Olympics
Athletes (track and field) at the 2006 Commonwealth Games
Commonwealth Games silver medallists for Australia
Sportswomen from New South Wales
Athletes from Sydney
Commonwealth Games medallists in athletics
20th-century Australian women
21st-century Australian women
Medallists at the 2006 Commonwealth Games